Gordon Dixon may refer to:

 Gordon Dixon (biochemist) (1930–2016), Canadian biochemist and professor
 Gordon Dixon (rugby union), Scottish rugby union player
 Gordon Dixon (footballer) (born 1936), Australian rules footballer